Kelly Marcela Ávalos (born 30 July 1996) is a Nicaraguan footballer who plays as a defender for the Nicaragua women's national team.

International career
Ávalos capped for Nicaragua at senior level during two 2014 Central American and Caribbean Games and the 2018 CONCACAF Women's Championship qualification.

References 

1996 births
Living people
Nicaraguan women's footballers
Women's association football defenders
Nicaragua women's international footballers